The Lenin Prize (Leninskaya premiya) was one of the most prestigious awards of the Soviet Union for accomplishments relating to science, literature, arts, architecture, and technology. It was originally created on June 23, 1925 and awarded until 1934. During the period from 1935 to 1956, the Lenin Prize was not awarded, being replaced largely by the Stalin Prize. On August 15, 1956, it was reestablished, and continued to be awarded on every even-numbered year until 1990. The award ceremony was April 22, Vladimir Lenin's birthday.

The Lenin Prize is different from the Lenin Peace Prize, which was awarded to foreign citizens rather than to citizens of the Soviet Union, for their contributions to the peace cause.  Also, the Lenin Prize should not be confused with the Stalin Prize or the later USSR State Prize. Some persons were awarded both the Lenin Prize and the USSR State Prize.

On April 23, 2018, the head of the Ulyanovsk Oblast, Sergey Ivanovich Morozov, reintroduced the Lenin Prize for achievements in the humanities, literature, and art to coincide with the 150th birthday of Lenin in 2020.

Awardee
Note: This list is incomplete, short, and differs in detail from the complete and much longer Russian list, and is in chronological order. (See Russian Wikipedia.)

Nikolai Kravkov (1926, Medicine)
Alexander Chernyshov (1930, radio engineering)
Nikolai Demyanov (1930, chemistry)
Sergei Sergeyev-Tsensky (1955, writer)
Andrei Sakharov (1956, physics)
Giorgi Melikishvili (1957, Historian)
Dimitri Nalivkin (1957, geology)
Okhotsimsky Dmitrii Evgenievich (1957, space science)
Pyotr Novikov (1957, mathematics, for proving the undecidability of the word problem for groups)
Sergei Prokofiev (1957, music, posthumously, for his Symphony No. 7)
Dmitri Shostakovich (1958, music composition)
Nikolay Bogolyubov (Николай Николаевич Боголюбов, 1958, physics)
Mikhail Leontovich (1958, physics)
Mikhail Shumayev (1958, physics)
Grigori Chukhrai (1959, contribution to the arts - Ballad of a Soldier)
Vladimir Veksler (1959, physics)
Mikhail Sholokhov (1960, literature, for And Quiet Flows the Don)
Alexander Bereznyak (Александр Яковлевич Березняк, 1961 for P-15 missile)
Sviatoslav Richter (1961, pianist)
Juhan Smuul (1961, literature)
Aleksei Pogorelov (Алексей Васильевич Погорелов, 1962, mathematics)
Korney Chukovsky (Корней Чуковский, 1962, for his book, Mastery of Nekrasov)
Nikolai Aleksandrovich Nevsky (Николай Александрович Невский, 1962, for his posthumous book Tangut Philology)
Vladimir Marchenko (1962, mathematics)
Chinghiz Aitmatov (Чингиз Айтматов, 1963, literature)
Hanon Izakson (Ханон Ильич Изаксон, 1964, farm machinery)
Mikhail Kalashnikov (Михаи́л Тимофе́евич Кала́шников, 1964, AK-47 assault rifle)
Vladimir Kotelnikov, 1964, (Sampling Theory)
Innokenty Smoktunovsky (Иннокентий Смоктуновский, 1965, acting)
Vladimir Igorevich Arnol'd, Andrey Nikolaevich Kolmogorov (Влади́мир И́горевич Арно́льд, Ленинская премия, 1965, mathematics)
Alexander Sergeevich Davydov (1966, physics)
Alexei Alexeyevich Abrikosov (Алексей Алексеевич Абрикосов, 1966, physics)
Alexander Sergeevich Davydov (1966, physics)
Antonina Fedorovna Prikhot'ko (1966, physics)
Emmanuel Rashba (Эммануил Иосифович Рашба, 1966, physics)
Vladimir L'vovich Broude (1966, Physics)
Igor Grekhov (1966, Semiconductor Technology) 
Mikhail Kim (1966, hydraulic engineering)
Igor Moiseyev (Игорь Моисеев, 1967, dance)
Ilya Lifshitz (1967, physics)
Mikhail Svetlov (Михаил Светлов, 1967, poetry, posthumously, for the book Verses of the Last Years)
Valery Panov (1969, dance)
Yevgeny Vuchetich (Евгений (Eugene) Вучетич, 1970, sculpture)
Yuri Nikolaevich Denisyuk (1970, holography)
Agniya Barto (Агния Львовна Барто, 1972, poetry?)
Yuri Ozerov (director) for his work Liberation (film series), 1972
Yuri Bondarev writer, for his work Liberation (film series), 1972
 Cinematographer for his work Liberation (film series), 1972
 Art Director for his work Liberation (film series), 1972
Konstantin Simonov (Константин Симонов, 1974, poetry)
Vladimir Lobashev (1974, physics)
Mikhail Simonov (Михаил Симонов, 1976, aircraft designer)
Gavriil Ilizarov (1979, medicine)
Anatol Zhabotinsky (Oscillating chemical reactions, 1980)
Boris Pavlovich Belousov (Oscillating chemical reactions, 1980)
Otar Taktakishvili (1982, music composition)
Boris Babaian (Борис Арташеcович Бабаян, 1987 for Elbrus-2 supercomputer)
Vladimir Teplyakov (1988, for the development of the RFQ)
Eugene D. Shchukin (1988, physical-chemical mechanics)
Kaisyn Kuliev (Кулиев Кайсын Шуваевич, 1990, Man.Bird.Tree. Poetry. Post-mortem)
Alykul Osmonov (Алыкул Осмонов, Kyrgyz poet and literary modernizer)
Irena Sedlecká (Sculpture)
Olga Avilova (Surgeon)
Yekaterina Alexandrovna Ankinovich (Geologist)
Natalia Shpiller (1951, opera singer)

Lenin Prize winners in Science

Nuclear Physics

1988 year
Rudolf M. Muradyan
For a series of innovative works “New quantum number – color and establishment of dynamical regularities in the quark structure of elementary particles and atomic nuclei” published during 1965 – 1977.

Kurchatov Institute of Atomic Energy

1958 year
Alexander M. Andrianov
Lev Andreevich Artsimovich (Лев Андреевич Арцимович)
Olga A. Bazilevskaya
Stanislav I. Braginskiy
Igor' N. Golovin
Mikhail A. Leontovich
Stepan Yu. Lukyanov
Samuil M. Osovets
Vasiliy I. Sinitsin
Nikolay V. Filippov
Natan A. Yavlinskiy
For research of powerful pulse discharges in gas for production of the high-temperature plasma, published in years.

1964 year
Aleksandr Emmanuilovich Nudel'man (Александр Эммануилович Нудельман)
For a series of innovative automatic cannons.

1966 year
 Yuri Raizer

1972 year
Vsevolod A. Belyaev
Oleg Borisovich Firsov (Олег Борисович Фирсов)
For a series of work "Elementary processes and non-elastic scattering at nuclear collisions”.
Vadim I. Utkin
1978 year
Vladilen S. Letokhov and Veniamin P. Chebotayev

1982 year
Viktor V. Orlov
For the work on fast neutron reactors.

1984 year
Valentin F. Demichev
For production of special chemical compounds and development of conditions of their application.

1984 year
Boris B. Kadomtsev
Oleg P. Pogutse
Vitaliy D. Shafranov
For a series of work "The theory of thermonuclear toroidal plasma".

Mathematics

1976 year
Nikolai Krasovski
Alexander B. Kurzhanski
Yury Osipov
A. Subbotin

Physiology

1965 year
 Sergei S. Bryukhonenko (posthumously)

Lenin Prize winners in Technology

Aircraft construction
For his work on Advanced Rocket and Aircraft propulsion systems, Sergei Tumansky was awarded the prize in 1957

For their work on the MiG 25 Heavy Interceptor:

R A Belyakov, General designer
N Z Matyuk, chief project engineer
I S Silayev, Gorkii aircraft factory director (later Minister of Aircraft Industry)
F Shukhov, engine project chief
F Volkov, radar project chief
A V Minayev, Deputy Minister of Aircraft Industry who headed task force 'Det 63' that was sent to Egypt in 1971.

Other 
 Nadezhda A. Agaltsova

See also 

 List of general science and technology awards

References

 
1925 establishments in the Soviet Union
1934 disestablishments in the Soviet Union
1956 establishments in the Soviet Union
1990 disestablishments in the Soviet Union
Civil awards and decorations of the Soviet Union
Civil awards and decorations of Russia
Lists of award winners
Awards established in 1925